A vaccine-preventable disease is an infectious disease for which an effective preventive vaccine exists. If a person acquires a vaccine-preventable disease and dies from it, the death is considered a vaccine-preventable death.

The most common and serious vaccine-preventable diseases tracked by the World Health Organization (WHO) are: diphtheria, Haemophilus influenzae serotype b infection, hepatitis B, measles, meningitis, mumps, pertussis, poliomyelitis, rubella, tetanus, tuberculosis, and yellow fever. The WHO reports licensed vaccines being available to prevent, or contribute to the prevention and control of, 31 vaccine-preventable infections.

Background
In 2012, the World Health Organization estimated that vaccination prevents 2.5 million deaths each year. With 100% immunization, and 100% efficacy of the vaccines, one out of seven deaths among young children could be prevented, mostly in developing countries, making this an important global health issue. Four diseases were responsible for 98% of vaccine-preventable deaths: measles, Haemophilus influenzae serotype b, pertussis, and neonatal tetanus.

The Immunization Surveillance, Assessment and Monitoring program of the WHO monitors and assesses the safety and effectiveness of programs and vaccines at reducing illness and deaths from diseases that could be prevented by vaccines.

Vaccine-preventable deaths are usually caused by a failure to obtain the vaccine in a timely manner. This may be due to financial constraints or to lack of access to the vaccine. A vaccine that is generally recommended may be medically inappropriate for a small number of people due to severe allergies or a damaged immune system. In addition, a vaccine against a given disease may not be recommended for general use in a given country, or may be recommended only to certain populations, such as young children or older adults. Every country makes its own immunization recommendations, based on the diseases that are common in its area and its healthcare priorities. If a vaccine-preventable disease is uncommon in a country, then residents of that country are unlikely to receive a vaccine against it. For example, residents of Canada and the United States do not routinely receive vaccines against yellow fever, which leaves them vulnerable to infection if travelling to areas where risk of yellow fever is highest (endemic or transitional regions).

List of vaccine-preventable diseases

The WHO lists 34 diseases for which vaccines are available:

 Cholera
 Covid-19
 Dengue fever
 Diphtheria
 Ebola
 Haemophilus influenzae type b
 Hepatitis A
 Hepatitis B
 Hepatitis E
 Human papillomavirus infection
 Influenza
 Japanese encephalitis
 Malaria
 Measles
 meningitis
 Monkeypox
 Mumps
 Pneumococcal disease
 Pertussis
 Poliomyelitis
 Rabies
 Rotavirus
 Rubella
 Smallpox
 Tetanus
 Tick-borne encephalitis
 Tuberculosis
 Typhoid fever
 Varicella
 Yellow fever
 Shingles (Herpes Zoster)
 Argentinian mammarenavirus 

typhus
Swine flu

Used in non humans
 Bordetella
 Canine distemper
 Canine influenza
 Canine parvovirus
 Chlamydia
 Feline calicivirus
 Feline distemper
 Feline leukemia
 Feline viral rhinotracheitis
 Leptospirosis
 Lyme disease

Vaccine-preventable diseases demonstrated in the laboratory on other animals

 Enterococcus gallinarum on mice (to prevent bacteria-triggered autoimmune disease)

See also
 Vaccination policy
 World Immunization Week
 Measles resurgence in the United States

References

External links
 

 
Preventable diseases
Infectious diseases